Kentucky's 6th congressional district is a congressional district in the U.S. state of Kentucky. Based in Central Kentucky, the district contains the cities of Lexington (including its suburbs), Richmond, and Georgetown. The district is currently represented by Republican Andy Barr.

Characteristics

Until January 1, 2006, Kentucky did not track party affiliation for registered voters who were neither Democratic nor Republican. The Kentucky voter registration card does not explicitly list anything other than Democratic Party, Republican Party, or Other, with the "Other" option having a blank line and no instructions on how to register as something else.

Recent statewide elections

List of members representing the district

Recent election results

2002

2004

2006

2008

2010

2012

2014

2016

2018

2020

2022

See also

Kentucky's congressional districts
List of United States congressional districts

References

 Congressional Biographical Directory of the United States 1774–present

06
1803 establishments in Kentucky
Constituencies established in 1803
Constituencies disestablished in 1933
1933 disestablishments in Kentucky
Constituencies established in 1935
1935 establishments in Kentucky